Raquel Kops-Jones and Abigail Spears were the defending champions, but the team was unable to participate because they were still active at the Sony Open in Miami.

Rika Fujiwara and Hsieh Shu-ying won the tournament, defeating Irina Falconi and Eva Hrdinová in the final, 6–3, 6–7(5–7), [10–4].

Seeds

Draw

References 
 Draw

The Oaks Club Challenger - Doubles